Thomas Woore (29 January 1804 – 21 June 1878) was a Royal Navy officer, grazier, railways leader and surveyor. Woore was born in Derry, County Londonderry, Ireland and died in Double Bay, Sydney, New South Wales.

He joined the Royal Navy in 1819 serving on various ships until retiring in 1834.  On 1 January 1835, he married Mary Dickson, daughter of John Dickson. From 1846 until 1848 he worked on his own surveying possibilities for the proposed railway line being put forward by the early version of the Sydney Railway Company. In 1867 he was commissioned, with others, to search for a solution to the water shortage of Sydney.

References

Further reading

 
 
 
 
 
 
 

Royal Navy officers
Australian farmers
Australian Anglicans
Australian people of Irish descent
1804 births
1878 deaths